Robert Nii Djan Dodoo (1934-2014) was a Ghanaian civil servant. He was the Head of the Civil Service from 1994 to 2001 during Jerry Rawlings civilian rule. He had served previously as executive director of the Price and Incomes Board.

After Rawlings exit from the presidency, he was accused and faced trial for financial loss to the state. He made a return to government office as Chairperson of the Civil Service Council under the presidential administrations of John Atta-Mills and John Mahama,  and was also a member of the National Development Planning Commission.

Civil Service

Appointment 
Dodoo worked as executive director of the Prices and Incomes Board, a subverted organization in Accra prior to the fourth Ghanaian republic.

In 1994, Dodoo was appointed to be Head of the Civil Service. Since he was not a career civil servant, his appointment sparked controversy within the civil service.

Removal from office
In 2001, the NPP administration of John Kufuor requested Dodoo to proceed on leave, and to hand over to K. Obeng Adofo who was chief director of the Office of the Head of Civil Service.

Trial

References  

1934 births
2014 deaths
Alumni of the Accra Academy
Ga-Adangbe people
Ghanaian civil servants